The Chino Valley Unified School District is a school district in San Bernardino County, California, United States. It serves the cities of Chino, Chino Hills, and the southwestern portion of Ontario, though originally it served only Chino when it was founded in 1860.  It now encompasses  and serves about 32,000 students from grades kindergarten up to 12th grade. CVUSD serves four high schools, five junior high schools, twenty-one elementary schools, one continuation school,  an adult school, & one Charter school.

District government
 Superintendent – Norm Enfield, Ed.D.

Board of Education
As of February 2020:
 President – Joe Schaffer (term expires 2022)
 Vice President – Cristina Gagnier (term expires 2022)
 Clerk – Irene Hernandez-Blair (term expires 2020)
 Member – James Na (term expires 2020)
 Member – Andrew Cruz (term expires 2020)

Schools
The CVUSD has always been recognized for its outstanding schools and programs. About half of the schools in the CVUSD have reached the state's API standard of 800.

The school year begins in August and ends on May every year.

High schools
 Ruben S. Ayala High School, Chino Hills
 Chino High School, Chino
 Chino Hills High School, Chino Hills
 Don Antonio Lugo High School, Chino

Alternative Schools
 Adult School
 Adult Education/Virtual School
 Boys Republic High School, Chino Hills
 Buena Vista, Chino
 Chino Valley Learning Academy

Junior High Schools
 Cal Aero Preserve Academy, Chino
 Woodcrest JHS, Ontario
 Canyon Hills JHS, Chino Hills
 Robert O. Townsend JHS, Chino Hills
 Ramona JHS, Chino
 Magnolia JHS, Chino

Fundamental Schools
 Anna A. Borba Fundamental (Elementary), Chino
 Lyle S. Briggs Elementary/ Jr. High Fundamental, Chino

Closed Schools (after 2008-2009)
 El Rancho, Chino (used by Oxford Preparatory Academy Chino from 2010 to 2016. Now used Alliegence Steam Academy Thrive Chino Valley)
 Richard Gird, Chino
 Los Serranos, Chino Hills

Charter Schools

Alliegence Steam Academy Thrive Chino

Elementary schools
 Cal Aero Preserve Academy, Chino
 Butterfield Ranch, Chino Hills
 Howard Cattle, Chino
 Alicia Cortez, Chino
 Country Springs, Chino Hills
 Levi Dickey, Ontario
 Doris Dickson, Chino
 Eagle Canyon, Chino Hills
 E.J. Marshall, Chino
 Glenmeade, Chino Hills
 Hidden Trails, Chino Hills
 Liberty, Ontario
 Gerald Litel, Chino Hills
 Newman, Chino
 Oak Ridge, Chino Hills
 Edwin Rhodes, Chino
 Rolling Ridge, Chino Hills
 Walnut Avenue, Chino
 Michael G. Wickman, Chino Hills
 Chaparral, Chino Hills

Controversies

First Amendment issues
The Chino Valley Unified School District Board has been at the center of a number of controversies in recent years regarding issues of the First Amendment.

The CVUSD Board itself has also faced criticism for multiple years for having public prayers, Bible readings, and Christian proselytizing during its public meetings. The majority of Board members are members of either Calvary Chapel Chino Hills or other similar Christian conservative congregations in the district, and most regularly tout their religious beliefs during Board discussions. Despite numerous letters of complaint from various individuals and groups, the Board has either ignored these complaints or officially rejected to change their practices.  The administration actively solicits local Christian pastors to lead Board invocations, and the Board regularly presents recognition awards to religious leaders who provide "support and prayers for the Chino Valley Unified School District".

In July 2010, the CVUSD approved a resolution to introduce "Bible as Literature and History" courses at its four high schools, based on a curricula provided by the local Calvary Chapel Chino Hills church and the textbook The Bible and its Influence, written by Christian Evangelical educational political activist Charles Stetson.

On November 11, 2014, the Freedom From Religion Foundation filed a federal lawsuit against the Board claiming violations of the US and California Constitutions.  Although the suit alleged that all of the Board members regularly participated in religious proselytizing, James Na, was singled out as a prime violator of religious neutrality during the meetings, regularly including Christian and Biblical references into many of his official statements. The suit alleges at one recent Board meeting, Na "urged everyone who does not know Jesus Christ to go and find Him," and closed the meeting with a reading of Psalm 143. On February 18, 2016, U.S. District Judge Jesus Bernal made a ruling on the FFRF lawsuit, ordering the Board to stop reciting prayers, Bible readings, and proselytizing during school board meetings. On March 4, 2016, the school board voted 3-2 in favor of appealing the ruling.

On November 3, 2016, the Board changed their policies to explicitly state when board members can and cannot express their faith during meetings. On July 25, 2018, a three-judge panel of the United States Court of Appeals for the Ninth Circuit unanimously affirmed the District Court's ruling, holding that the "policy and practice of prayer at Chino Valley Board meetings  violates  the  Establishment  Clause."

School closures

On March 5, 2009, the Chino Valley Unified School District Board of Education voted 4 to 1 vote to approve a budget reduction plan which included the closure of El Rancho Elementary School and Richard Gird Elementary School, both in Chino, and Los Serranos Elementary School in Chino Hills.  Ms. Sylvia Orozco, Board President, Mr. William Klein, Vice President, Mr. Fred Youngblood, Clerk and Mr. James Na, Board member all voted in favor of the budget reduction plan based on the recommendations of the Chino Valley Unified School District Superintendent, Dr. Edmond T. Heatley. Mr. Michael Calta, Board member was the dissenting vote. These three schools were closed at the end of the 2008/2009 school year and their students were reassigned to other schools in the District.

The process in which these schools were selected to be closed were alleged to violate California Education Code 17387, which states, "It is the intent of the Legislature to have the community involved before decisions are made about school closure or the use of surplus space, thus avoiding community conflict and assuring building use that is compatible with the community's needs and desires". Charges were made against the Board of racial / national origin motivations in choosing the schools that they did close.

A complaint was issued with the US Department of Education Office for Civil Rights regarding the nature and process followed for these school closings. On June 29, 2012, the OCR closed its investigation and released its final report of its findings of the allegations.  The report found that, while there were good budgetary reasons for the District to be closing schools at this time, the process used to do so was ad-hoc and disorganized, and appeared to rely principally on the opinions of the District Superintendent with little documentation, public input or transparency.  In response, the CVUSD agreed with the OCR's findings and adopted new formal policies for school closure which provided greater transparency and public input into the process.

Conflict of interest and perjury
In 2006, a member of the school district board was charged with conflict of interest and perjury for allegedly benefiting from a contract between the school district and his employer. He is accused of steering district business to Office Max and failing to accurately report his income at that company in his annual conflict-of-interest statement with the school board.

References

External links
 

School districts in San Bernardino County, California
School districts established in 1860
Chino, California
Ontario, California
Education in San Bernardino County, California
Chino Hills, California
1860 establishments in California